George Blackwell was a British racehorse trainer. He was Champion Trainer in 1903 and is one of the few trainers to have trained both an Epsom Derby winner (Rock Sand, 1903) and a Grand National winner (Sergeant Murphy, 1923).

References 

British racehorse trainers
1861 births
1942 deaths